The Aftermath is the second album by the American hip hop group Da Youngsta's. it was released on April 20, 1993 by East West. The album has only two guest appearances: Pete Rock & CL Smooth on the song "Who's the Mic Wrecka" and Treach of Naughty by Nature on "Crewz Pop". It does, however, feature production from some of the most influential New York City producers, including DJ Premier, Pete Rock and Marley Marl.  The album also has a notably more aggressive and edgy tone compared to their first effort. The album features three singles: "Crewz Pop", "Iz U Wit Me" and "Wild Child".

Track listing

References

1993 albums
Da Youngsta's albums
Atlantic Records albums
East West Records albums
Albums produced by Pete Rock
Albums produced by DJ Premier
Albums produced by Marley Marl
Albums produced by the Beatnuts